Sefro is a comune (municipality) in the Province of Macerata in the Italian region Marche, located about  southwest of Ancona and about  southwest of Macerata.

Sefro borders the following municipalities: Camerino, Fiuminata, Pioraco, Serravalle di Chienti.

Among the churches are:
 Madonna dei Calcinari.
 San Tossano.
 San Pietro.

Demographic evolution

References

Cities and towns in the Marche